Pixie Lott is an English pop music singer-songwriter. Lott began her career as a songwriter, penning tracks for several artists in the late-2000s. In 2008, she signed a recording contract with Mercury Records in the United Kingdom and Interscope Records in the United States. She has released two studio albums: Turn It Up (2009) and Young Foolish Happy (2011).

Turn It Up, her debut studio album, was released in September 2009. It reached number six in the UK and was certified double platinum by the British Phonographic Industry (BPI). Singles from the album included "Mama Do (Uh Oh, Uh Oh)" and "Boys and Girls". Turn It Up earned the singer six awards, including two MTV Europe Music Awards (Best UK & Ireland Act and MTV Push Artist), a Variety Club Award (Breakthrough Talent) and a Virgin Media Music Award (Best Newcomer).

Her second studio album, Young Foolish Happy, followed in November 2011. It peaked at number eighteen in the UK and was certified gold by the BPI. Singles included "All About Tonight" and "Kiss the Stars". The album earned Lott a second Virgin Media Music Award for Hottest Female and a BRIT Award nomination for Best British Single for "All About Tonight". Lott has also been recognized by the BT Digital Music Awards, Glamour Awards, Meteor Music Awards, MP3 Music Awards, NME Awards and Q Awards. Overall, she has received seven awards from eighteen nominations.

BRIT Awards
The Brit Awards are the British Phonographic Industry's (BPI) annual pop music awards. Lott has received one award out of four nominations.

BT Digital Music Awards 
The BT Digital Music Awards are held annually in the United Kingdom. Lott has received one nomination.

Glamour Awards 
The Glamour Awards are awarded annually by Glamour magazine to honour extraordinary and inspirational women from a variety of fields, including entertainment, business, sports, music, science, medicine, education and politics. Lott has received one nomination.

Meteor Music Awards
The Meteor Music Awards are distributed by MCD Productions and are the national music awards of Ireland. Lott has received one nomination.

MP3 Music Awards 
The MP3 Music Awards were established in 2007 to honour popular artists and quality MP3 players and retailers. Lott has received one award from one nomination.

MTV Europe Music Awards
The MTV Europe Music Awards were established in 1994 by MTV Europe to celebrate the most popular music videos in Europe. Lott has received two awards from three nominations.

NME Awards 
The NME Awards are an annual music awards show founded by the music magazine NME. Lott has received one nomination.

Q Awards 
The Q Awards are the UK's annual pop music awards run by the music magazine Q to honor musical excellence. Winners are voted by readers of Q. Lott has received one nomination.

Ultimate Women of the Year Awards
The Ultimate Women of the Year Awards are awarded annually by Cosmopolitan magazine. Lott has received one award from one nomination.

UK Festival Awards
The UK Festival Awards are awarded annually, with various categories for all aspects of festivals that have taken place in the UK. Lott has received one nomination.

Variety Club Awards 
The Variety Club Awards are an annual awards show presented by Variety, a children's charity. Lott has received one award from one nomination.

Virgin Media Music Awards 
The Virgin Media Music Awards are held annually in the United Kingdom. Lott has received two awards from two nominations.

Žebřík Music Awards
{| class="wikitable"
|-
!Year
!width="250"|Nominated work
!width="325"|Award
!width="65"|Result
!Ref.
|-
| align="center" rowspan=2|2009
| rowspan=2|Pixie Lott
| Best International Female
| 
| rowspan=2|
|-
| Best International Discovery
|

4Music Video honours 
The 4Music Video Honours is an annual music awards show by 4Music, a music and entertainment channel in the United Kingdom and available on some digital television providers in the Republic of Ireland.
{| class="wikitable"
|-
!Year
!width="250"|Nominated work
!width="325"|Award
!width="65"|Result
!Ref.
|-
|-
| rowspan=2|2011
| "All About Tonight"
| Best Video
| 
| rowspan=2|
|-
| Pixie Lott
| Best Girl
|

References

External links
Pixie Lott's official website

Lott